is a passenger railway station in the town of Daigo, Kuji District, Ibaraki Prefecture, operated by East Japan Railway Company (JR East).

Lines
Shimonomiya Station is served by the Suigun Line, and is located 62.0 rail kilometers from the official starting point of the line at Mito Station.

Station layout
The station consists of a single side platform serving traffic in both directions. The station is unattended.

History
Shimonomiya Station opened on April 16, 1930. The station was absorbed into the JR East network upon the privatization of the Japanese National Railways (JNR) on April 1, 1987.

Surrounding area

 Kujigawa River
 Shimonomiya Post Office
 Daigo Onsen
 Takachihara-iriguchi bus stop
Kamimyoga Line bound for Higashidate Station via Yamatsuriyama Station departs from the bus stop.

Route buses
Ibaraki Kotsu
For Jaketsu
For Karatake-Kubo
For Hitachi-Daigo Station

See also
List of railway stations in Japan

References

External links

  JR East Station information 

Railway stations in Ibaraki Prefecture
Suigun Line
Railway stations in Japan opened in 1930
Daigo, Ibaraki